This article lists the confirmed national futsal squads for the 2010 UEFA Futsal Championship tournament held in Hungary, between January 19 and January 30, 2010.

Group A

Head coach: Alesio

Head coach: Tomáš Neumann

Head coach: Mihály Kozma

Group B

Head coach: Roberto Menichelli

Head coach: Gennadiy Lysenchuk

Head coach: Benny Meurs

Group C

Head coach: Sergei Skorovich

Head coach: Aca Kovačević

Head coach: Andrej Dobovičnik

Group D

Head coach: Valeri Dosko

Head coach: Orlando Duarte

Head coach: José Venancio López

External links
UEFA.com

UEFA Futsal Championship squads
Squads